Derek West (born March 28, 1972) is a former American football tackle. He played for the Indianapolis Colts from 1995 to 1997.

References

1972 births
Living people
Players of American football from Denver
American football offensive tackles
Colorado Buffaloes football players
Indianapolis Colts players
Rhein Fire players
American expatriate sportspeople in Germany